Lucius Calpurnius Piso Frugi (sometimes Censorinus) (c. 180 – 112 BC) was a Roman politician and historian of plebeian origin, consul in 133 BC and censor in 120 BC.

Family background
Piso belonged to the plebeian gens Calpurnia, which emerged during the First Punic War and was of Etruscan descent. The Pisones were the most important family of the gens and remained on the fore of Roman politics during the Empire; their first member was Gaius Calpurnius Piso, praetor in 211, also grandfather of Piso the historian. This man had two sons, Gaius, the first consul of the gens in 180 who also earned a triumph for his successful command in Spain in 186, and Lucius, only known as ambassador to the Achaean League in 198; the latter was the father of the historian. The next generation of the Calpurnii Pisones had an impressive number of consuls—four in 16 years—as in addition to Piso's own consulship in 133, his cousins Lucius Caesoninus, Gnaeus, and Quintus were also consuls, respectively in 148, 138 and 135. Piso was likely born between 182 and 179.

Career

Tribune of the Plebs (149 BC) 
Piso probably did his ten-year military service between 165 and 152. He is first mentioned in the sources as tribune of the plebs in 149, in his early thirties. The previous year, the propraetor Servius Sulpicius Galba had slaughtered 9,000 Lusitanians through treachery. When Galba returned to Rome in 149, he was sued before the people by Lucius Scribonius Libo, Piso's colleague as tribune of the plebs; despite Cato the Censor's vehement support of the accusation, Galba was acquitted. Both Cato and Piso had clients in Spain, who were worried by Galba's exactions and asked their patrons to protect them. Piso therefore passed the Lex Calpurnia de Repetundis, which established the first permanent criminal court to judge Roman governors' misdeeds in their province—before 149, governors were judged by an ad-hoc court. The lex Calpurnia provided that the peregrine praetor directed the court and chose the jurors from the Senate; governors found guilty had to repay the sums extorted. This law was a milestone in Roman criminal law, and came at a time when several senators became worried that the exactions committed in the provinces—as Galba did in Lusitania—could alienate the local populations and stain Rome's international reputation.

Praetor (c.136 BC) 

Piso was certainly praetor before 135, as the Lex Villia required a three-year wait between holding two magistracies (and Piso was consul in 133). The dominant opinion among modern scholars is that Piso served as praetor in Sicily in a year between 138 and 136, and he was defeated by the revolted slaves of Eunus during the First Servile War. However, knowledge of this war is very poor, and mostly comes from epitomes deriving from the lost books of Livy's Ab Urbe Condita. The only mention of Piso as praetor in ancient sources is found in the epitome of Florus (dating from the 2nd century AD), who says that "The camps even of praetors (the utmost disgrace of war) were taken by him [Eunus]; nor will I shrink from giving their names; they were the camps of [Manlius], Lentulus, Piso, and Hypsaeus". From there, it has been assumed that Florus gave the names of the successive Sicilian praetors in chronological or reverse-chronological order between 138 and 135. 

Correy Brennan nevertheless notes that Florus is often careless in his chronology, and also frequently mixes commanders' titles. What he calls "praetor" could have been legate, quaestor, praetor, or even consul. Therefore, Brennan suggests instead that Piso did not serve in Sicily as praetor, but only as consul in 133. Since Florus tells Piso was defeated, it would be very strange to see him winning the consular election at the first possible occasion—despite his disgrace—, when the other identified commanders listed by Florus vanish from history or had to wait a longer time before reaching the consulship.

Consul (133 BC) 
Piso became consul in 133 alongside the plebeian Publius Mucius Scaevola. Scaevola and Piso are respectively described as consul prior and posterior, which means the Centuriate Assembly elected Scaevola first. He was assigned Sicily as his province, while Scaevola remained in Rome. Sicily was initially given to a praetor, but since the praetors sent in 136 and 135 against the revolted slaves were defeated, the Senate appointed a consul in 134 to deal with them. The previous consul, Gaius Fulvius Flaccus, did nothing of note though.

Piso probably picked the praetor Marcus Perperna to serve with him in Sicily, because he was a homo novus with an Etruscan background. He likely started his campaign by besieging Henna, the epicenter of the rebellion, because several sling bullets bearing his name have been found in the area. Then, Piso might have left the conduct of the siege to Perperna while he campaigned in another part of Sicily. The First Servile War was concluded the following year when the consul Publius Rupilius captured Tauromenium and Perperna ended the siege of Henna.

Enemy of Gaius Gracchus (123–121 BC) 
Since Piso was in Sicily during his entire consulship, ancient sources do not tell his attitude towards Tiberius Gracchus, who as tribune of the plebs passed several social and constitutional reforms in 133. It is generally assumed that Piso was among his opponents, because he was later an outspoken enemy of Gaius Gracchus (Tiberius' younger brother), but several politicians initially supported Tiberius and later opposed his reforms or his attempt to be reelected as tribune, starting with Scaevola, Piso's consular colleague. D. C. Earl suggests that Piso initially regarded Tiberius' program with a "benevolent neutrality" as he had connections with the Fulvii Flacci and the patrician Claudii.

He was a strong opponent of the Gracchi, particularly in relation to the grain laws of Gaius Gracchus in 123 BC.

Censor (120–119 BC) 
Piso was elected censor in 120 together with the plebeian Quintus Caecilius Metellus Baliaricus. The Fasti Capitolini are missing for these years, but since later writers citing or mentioning Piso tell he was censor, he must have been censor in 120 as it is the only year available. As a result, nothing is known of the censors' activity, apart that they likely reappointed Publius Cornelius Lentulus as princeps senatus. The censors' election took place in the aftermath of the murder of Gaius Gracchus and his supporters in 121, which saw the domination of the conservative faction led by the powerful Caecilii Metelli family, and further indicates Piso's conservative background.

The Annales
At the end of his life, Piso wrote a History of Rome, following several earlier Roman statesmen who wrote history, such as Cato the Censor, or Aulus Postumius Albinus. Among the 19 mentions of Piso's work found in ancient sources, 16 call it Annales, which suggest that it was the title that Piso gave to his book. The last dated fragment of the Annales deals with an event taking place in 146 (about the date of the fourth Ludi saeculares), so Piso likely started his book after this date. As there are an unusual number of references to censorial activity in the Annales' fragments, it is probable that Piso wrote them in his later years, after his own censorship in 120–119—a situation similar to that of Cato who composed the Origines in his last years. Moreover, later authors who cite Piso often call him Censorius ("the censor"), a further hint that he was already a former censor when he wrote the Annales. This additional name might have been used by Piso in his work.

The Annales were written in at least seven books, from the legendary foundation of Rome by Aeneas to Piso's own times. Like most other Roman historians, Piso devoted a significant portion of the work to mythologic times and the Regal period, covered in the first book. Then, book two likely covered the beginnings of the Republic to a milestone event such as the Fall of Veii in 396, or the Sack of Rome in 387. The third book probably described the events up to the War against Pyrrhus (280–275), or the First Punic War (264–241). The chronology for the remaining four books is lacking; Piso possibly wrote about the events down to the second half of the 2nd century by covering one generation per book. The majority of modern historians think that Piso continued his work after the last fragment dated from 146 in order to describe the events of his consulship and censorship. The existence of an 8th book has been suggested, in which Piso could have written an apologia of his political deeds during his magistracies.

He is best known for his Annals, a seven book annalistic history of Rome that spanned from the mythical founding of Rome until 146 BC. His historical account, now lost and known to us from only forty-nine short quotations or paraphrases, was written in a simple style of Latin. Later historians relied upon his work, though many did not find it satisfactory. Cicero considered his work jejune, and Livy did not consider him fully reliable, due to his tendency to moralize and politicize the histories that he recounted. Aulus Gellius, however, an admirer of the archaic, commended the work and quoted the only major fragment that has survived until today. Moreover, the early 19th-century iconoclastic historian, Barthold Georg Niebuhr, wrote that Piso was the first Roman historian to introduce systematic forgeries. Despite its shortcomings, Piso's historical work is important because it was the first time that an account was structured into individual years, making it the earliest history to follow the so-called "annalistic scheme."

List of fragments

See also
 Annals & Annalists
 Roman historiography

References

Bibliography

Ancient sources 

 Aulus Gellius, Attic Nights.
Censorinus, De Die Natali.
Diodorus Siculus, Bibliotheca historica.
Florus, Epitome of Roman History (English translation by John Selby Watson on Wikisource)
Livy, Ab Urbe Condita Libri.
Origo gentis romanae.
 Pliny the Elder, Historia Naturalis (English translation by Harris Rackham, W.H.S. Jones, and D.E. Eichholz on Wikisource).
 Plutarch, Parallel lives (Numa).

Modern sources 
T. Corey Brennan, "The commanders in the First Sicilian Slave War", Rivista di Filologia e Istruzione Classica, 1993, n°121, pp. 153–184.
——, The Praetorship in the Roman Republic, Oxford University Press, 2000.
 T. Robert S. Broughton, The Magistrates of the Roman Republic, American Philological Association, 1951–1952.
 Martine Chassignet, L'Annalistique romaine. Tome II, L'annalistique moyenne (fragments), Paris : Les Belles Lettres, 2003. 
Tim Cornell (editor), The Fragments of the Roman Historians, Oxford University Press, 2013.
D. C. Earl, “Calpurnii Pisones in the Second Century BC”, Athenaeum, 1960, 38, pp. 283–298.
 Gary Forsythe, The historian L. Calpurnius Piso Frugi and the Roman annalistic tradition, Lanham, MD, 1994. 
 Erich S. Gruen, Roman Politics and the Criminal Courts, 149–78 B.C., Cambridge, MA, Harvard University Press, 1978.
 August Pauly, Georg Wissowa, Elimar Klebs, Friedrich Münzer, et alii, Realencyclopädie der Classischen Altertumswissenschaft (abbreviated RE), J. B. Metzler, Stuttgart, 1894–1980.
Hermann Peter, Historicorum Romanorum reliquiae, Leipzig, 1914.
 Francis X. Ryan, Rank and Participation in the Republican Senate, Stuttgart, Franz Steiner Verlag, 1998.
 Graham Vincent Sumner, The Orators in Cicero's Brutus: Prosopography and Chronology, (Phoenix Supplementary Volume XI.), Toronto and Buffalo, University of Toronto Press, 1973.
Lily Ross Taylor and T. Robert S. Broughton, "The Order of the Two Consuls' Names in the Yearly Lists", Memoirs of the American Academy in Rome, 1949, 19, pp. 3–14.

180 BC births
2nd-century BC historians
2nd-century BC Roman consuls
Frugi, Lucius
Latin historians
Roman censors
Roman Republican praetors
Tribunes of the plebs
Year of death unknown